LeRoy R. Taylor (August 11, 1902 – March 7, 1968), nicknamed "Ben", was an American Negro league outfielder in the 1920s and 1930s.

A native of Marshall, Texas, Taylor attended Wiley College. He made his Negro leagues debut in 1925 with the Chicago American Giants and Birmingham Black Barons. Taylor spent several seasons with the Kansas City Monarchs, and represented Kansas City in the 1936 East–West All-Star Game. He died in Los Angeles, California in 1968 at age 65.

References

External links
 and Baseball-Reference Black Baseball stats and Seamheads

1902 births
1968 deaths
Birmingham Black Barons players
Chicago American Giants players
Cleveland Red Sox players
Homestead Grays players
Indianapolis ABCs players
Indianapolis ABCs (1931–1933) players
Kansas City Monarchs players
People from Marshall, Texas
Baseball players from Texas
20th-century African-American sportspeople
Baseball outfielders